This page is about the naturalized and foreign-born Ukrainian players who played one match (minimum) for the Ukraine senior national football team.

The players in bold are currently playing for the National team

Belarus

Born during the Soviet Union 

 Artem Milevskyi 2006–2012

Brazil 

 Edmar 2011–2014
 Marlos 2017–2021
Júnior Moraes 2019–

Cuba 

 Vyacheslav Kernozenko 2000–2008

Georgia

Born during the Soviet Union 

 Serhiy Danylovskyi 2007
 Akhrik Tsveiba 1992

Germany

Born in the East Germany 

 Oleh Kuznetsov 1992–1994

Israel 

 Viktor Tsyhankov 2016–

Kazakhstan

Born during the Soviet Union 

 Serhiy Skachenko 1994–2002
 Dmytro Yakovenko 1993

Kyrgyzstan

Born during the Soviet Union 

 Yuriy Hudymenko 1992

Russia

Born during the Soviet Union 

 Oleksandr Aliyev 2008–2012
 Aleksei Bakharev 2002
 Tymerlan Huseynov 1993–1997
 Yuriy Kalitvintsev 1995–1999
 Serhiy Kandaurov 1992–2000
 Sergei Kormiltsev 2000–2004
 Maksym Levytskyi 2000–2002
 Viktor Leonenko 1992–1996
 Andriy Nesmachniy 2000–2009
 Oleg Salenko 1992
 Serhiy Serebrennikov 2001–2006
 Serhiy Snytko 2001
 Dmytro Topchiyev 1992–1993
 Dmytro Tyapushkin 1994–1995
 Andriy Yarmolenko 2009–
 Artem Yashkin 2000–2001
 Serhiy Yesin 1996

Serbia

Born during the SFR Yugoslavia 

 Marko Dević 2008–2014

List of countries

References 

Born outside
Ukraine
Association football player non-biographical articles
Post-Soviet states
Ukrainian diaspora
Ukraine
Immigration to Ukraine